Cults is a 3D printing marketplace allowing designers, makers and other users to share free and paid models meant for 3D printing. It is also a social network where 3D printing enthusiasts can interact.

History
Cults was founded in 2014 and is the first fully independent 3D printing marketplace.

In 2015, La Poste establishes a partnership with Cults and 3D Slash to develop impression3d.laposte.fr, a digital manufacturing service, allowing users to have objects printed and shipped to them on demand.

In 2016, Boulanger partners with Cults to develop Happy 3d, an open source platform dedicated to spare parts printing, in an effort to promote sustainable consumption.

Name
The name Cults is a semordnilap: Read from right to left, it spells St-Luc, patron saint of artists and sculptors. Additionally, the first three letters are STL, referring to the common stereolithography file format used by creators.

See also

References

External links
 Official website

3D printing websites
3D publishing
Internet properties established in 2014
Companies based in Paris